United Nations Security Council resolution 1024, adopted unanimously on 28 November 1995, after considering a report by the Secretary-General Boutros Boutros-Ghali regarding the United Nations Disengagement Observer Force (UNDOF), the Council noted its efforts to establish a durable and just peace in the Middle East.

The resolution decided to call upon the parties concerned to immediately implement Resolution 338 (1973), it renewed the mandate of the Observer Force for another six months until 31 May 1996 and requested that the Secretary-General submit a report on the situation at the end of that period.

The Force was established in 1974 to supervise the ceasefire called for in an agreement between Israeli and Syrian forces.

See also
 Arab–Israeli conflict
 Golan Heights
 Israel–Syria relations
 List of United Nations Security Council Resolutions 1001 to 1100 (1995–1997)

References

External links
 
Text of the Resolution at undocs.org

 1024
 1024
1995 in Israel
1995 in Syria
 1024
November 1995 events